Jim Norick Arena (formerly Fairgrounds Arena) is a large multi-purpose arena located at State Fair Park in Oklahoma City, Oklahoma. Completed in 1965 at a cost of $2.4 million, it was the largest indoor facility in Oklahoma City until the construction of the Myriad Convention Center. It is named for Jim Norick, the mayor of Oklahoma City during the building's construction.

The building was unique in that it had the largest roof of its type in the world. It is the second largest city-owned multi-purpose arena, after Paycom Center, and it has the largest impact for a publicly owned facility in Oklahoma City.

It was home to the Oklahoma City Blazers of the CHL from 1965 to 1972. It was also home to the Professional Rodeo Cowboys Association’s National Finals Rodeo from 1965 to 1978, when the event was moved to the Myriad.

Elvis Presley played here on November 16, 1970, to a sell out crowd of around 11,000. The Grateful Dead's performance on October 19, 1973, was recorded and later released as Dick's Picks Volume 19.

Today, the arena is used during the Oklahoma State Fair to host Disney on Ice and the state fair rodeo. It is also the venue for the Oklahoma small school state basketball tournaments, school graduations, and various other equine events through the year.

Construction on a new $85 million coliseum to replace the Norick Arena is scheduled to begin in September 2022, after which the old arena will be demolished.

References

External links

 Jim Norick Arena – OKC Fairgrounds
 Jim Norick Arena – Oklahoma State Fair

Indoor arenas in Oklahoma
Basketball venues in Oklahoma
Indoor ice hockey venues in the United States
Sports venues in Oklahoma City
Economy of Oklahoma City
Oklahoma City Blazers (1965–1977)
1965 establishments in Oklahoma
Sports venues completed in 1965